Julia Gray McMordie  (30 March 1860 – 12 April 1942) was an English-born Ulster Unionist Party politician in Northern Ireland.

McMordie was born in Hartlepool, County Durham, England, the daughter of shipbuilder Sir William Gray and Dorothy Gray (née Hall). Her father, who owned William Gray & Company,  was elected mayor of Hartlepool in 1861 and 1862, and was the first mayor of West Hartlepool in 1887. He was knighted in 1890. A Presbyterian, she was educated at Chislehurst, Kent. On 8 April 1885, she married prominent Belfast barrister Robert James McMordie; the couple made their home at Cabin Hill, Knock, Belfast. Her brother was created a baronet in 1917 as Sir William Cresswell Gray, 1st Baronet of Tunstall Manor, Hartlepool.

During the First World War, she was President of the St John Voluntary Aid Detachments in Belfast. She was appointed a Member of the Order of the British Empire (MBE) in the 1918 New Year Honours, and upgraded to a Commander (CBE) in the 1919 New Year Honours.

In 1921, McMordie was one of two women elected to the first Parliament of Northern Ireland, she represented South Belfast. She did not stand for re-election in 1925. In 1925, after she was widowed, she moved to East Cliff, Budleigh Salterton, Devon, in order to be near her family (a son, John Andrew, and daughter, Elsie Gray). She was the first female High Sheriff of Belfast (in 1928).

She died, in 1942, at her daughter's home in King's Cliffe, Northamptonshire.

References

External links
 

1860 births
1942 deaths
Commanders of the Order of the British Empire
Women members of the House of Commons of Northern Ireland
High Sheriffs of Belfast
Members of the House of Commons of Northern Ireland 1921–1925
Presbyterians from Northern Ireland
People from Chislehurst
People from Hartlepool
Ulster Unionist Party members of the House of Commons of Northern Ireland
Members of the House of Commons of Northern Ireland for Belfast constituencies